"Y Control" is a single by Yeah Yeah Yeahs, from their debut album Fever to Tell. The name of the song refers to the emotional control of a female, referring to the male Y chromosome, and can also be read as a reference to Prince's 1995 song "Pussy Control," which is frequently abbreviated as "P Control." The song's music video was controversial for its disturbing imagery; nonetheless, it received some play on MTV and its sister station, MTV2. The song is part of the soundtrack of the 2009 video game Dirt 2.

Critical reception
The song was met with universal acclaim upon its release, with many critics noting it as one of the album's highlights. Pitchfork Media listed "Y Control" as the 213th best song of the decade.

Music video
The music video for "Y Control", directed by Spike Jonze, was controversial for its images of children carrying the body of a dead dog, giving the middle finger, and a subtitled portrayal of child mutilation including the chopping of a boy's hand and another boy disemboweling himself with a knife. MTV and MTV2 agreed to air the video; however, they included a disclaimer from Jonze at the beginning, and blurred out some of the video's more offensive material. The unedited version is available on their "Tell Me What Rockers to Swallow" DVD.

Entertainment Weekly gave a negative review of the video, describing it as "a sort of fairy tale gone wrong," and calling it "amateurish." It was put into rotation on MTV and MTV2.

Commercial performance
The song reached number 54 on the UK Singles chart. It was the least successful single from Fever to Tell.

Charts

Track listing
"Y Control"
"Y Control" (The Faint remix)
"Y Control" (Live at the Fillmore)

References

External links

2004 singles
Yeah Yeah Yeahs songs
American new wave songs
Music videos directed by Spike Jonze
2003 songs
Interscope Records singles
Songs written by Karen O
Songs written by Brian Chase
Songs written by Nick Zinner